Andreaea frigida, commonly known as icy rockmoss, is a moss endemic to Europe which is found in mountainous regions in Austria, the Czech Republic, France, Germany, Hungary, Italy, Norway, Romania, Poland, and Spain. In the UK its occurrence is widespread in  the Cairngorms National Park, where it is typically found on rocks in burns fed by snow patches,  but it is not found elsewhere except at a single site in the Lake District of England.

The earliest records for the UK date to 1854, (although its existence was not formally recognised until 1988), and it is classified as "Vulnerable". The greatest threat to its continuing existence is assumed to be global warming.

See also
Endemic Scottish moss species:
 Bryoerythrophyllum caledonicum
 Bryum dixonii
 Pohlia scotica
Flora of Scotland

References

Andreaeaceae
Flora of Scotland